Miu Lê (born 5 July 1991 in Ho Chi Minh City) is a Vietnamese singer and actress.

Life and career
Miu Le's real name is Le Anh Nhat (born 5 July 1991 in Ho Chi Minh City), she went to Vo Thi Sau Highschool, Ho Chi Minh City.

2009–2010: Acting debut and switching to singing 
She shared that her mother forced her to attend a modeling class to lose weight and adjust her posture. In this class, she was chosen by director Le Hoang for the movie Thu Tuong (Prime Minister), unfortunately the movie wasn't released. Afterward, she continued working with director Le Hoang in Nhung Thien Than Ao Trang (White Shirt Angels), marking her acting debut.

She switched to singing as signing contract with NewGen Entertainment (also Khong Tu Quynh's management) under alias Miu Le which is made from her character July Miu and her last name. She released some songs such as Khong Gian Vang, Rieng Minh Em, but they did not impress the audience.

2011–2013: Style changing and reception 
In 2011, she starred in four movies: Thien Su 99, Oan Gia Dai Chien, Gia Dinh Dau Yeu and Toi Nay, 8 gio!

At the end of 2011, she left NewGen and signed with Avatar Entertainment. As she had her style changed completely for the release of her new singles including Ngay Xa Anh and Em Nho Anh, these songs were considered as hits as they topped in many music charts like Zing, Yan,...Her next songs also regularly topped music charts.

In 2012, she had a voice-over for Ky Bang Ha 4 alongside Chi Tai, after this project, she joined the reality show 12 Ca Tinh Len Duong Xuyen Viet.

In 2013, she released a trio music video Lang Tham Yeu, Gia Vo Nhung Em Yeu Anh, Em Van Hy Vong, especially Gia Vo Nhung Em Yeu Anh topped in many music charts. After the project, she starred in two movies for Lunar New Year, Yeu Anh! Em Dam Khong? and Nha Co 5 Nam Nang Tien. In July, she had a voice over for Xi Trum 2 alongside Thanh Loc.

2014: Releasing 2 singles, 1 album and first liveshow 
In early 2014, she cooperated with Only C to release single Ta La Cho Nhau during Valentine, then she released album Quen nhu chua tung yeu. Around the end of 2014, she released another single Minh Tung Yeu Nhau.

November 2014, she and Ngo Kien Huy held her first live show Toi Toa Sang. After the live show, she released music video Vut Tan Di and stayed hiatus after this release.

2015–2017: Breakthrough with Em La Ba Noi Cua Anh (Sweet 20) 
In 2015, she had another voice-over for character Joy of Inside Out. Then she starred in the movie Em La Ba Noi Cua Anh.

In 2016, she came back to singing as releasing Yeu Mot Nguoi Co Le. In 12 April, she released music video Anh Dang Noi Dau as a cooperation with Trinh Thang Binh's BPro Entertainment. Also in this year, she had another voice over in Ky Bang Ha 5 and starred in two movies, Ban Gai Toi La Sep and Co Gai Den Tu Hom Qua.

Early 2017, she starred in the movie Nang 2 alongside Thu Trang, Hoang Phi,...

In 6 July, she released music video Con Gi Giua Chung Ta. In November, she joined TV show Sao Dai Chien however left after episode 6.

2018: Comeback with "Muon" (Wanna) 
In 11 September, she released the music video Muon (Wanna) after a one-year hiatus. Through this video, she wants to demonstrate that she will do anything to get what she wants. The song is specially composed by Hua Kim Tuyen.

Songs
Riêng mình em
Giấc mơ thần tiên
Ngày mới ngọt ngào
Không còn nhau
Mình từng yêu nhau
Quà cho anh
Quên như chưa từng yêu
Đừng bắt em phải quên
Vụt tan đi
Yêu một người có lẽ
Anh đang nơi đâu
Còn gì giữa chúng ta
Mình yêu từ bao giờ

Filmography
Những thiên thần áo trắng
Những giấc mơ hồng
Thiên sứ 99
Gia đình dấu yêu
Oan gia đại chiến
Tối nay, 8 giờ!
Ice Age: Continental Drift
Nhà có năm nàng tiên – Five Fairies in the House
Yêu anh, em dám không?
The Smurfs 2
Inside Out
Em là bà nội của anh – Sweet 20
Ice Age: Collision Course
Bạn gái tôi là sếp – She's the Boss
Cô gái đến từ hôm qua – The Girl from Yesterday
Nắng 2
Hidden Voices (season 2)

References

External links
 
 

1991 births
Living people
21st-century Vietnamese women singers
Vietnamese pop singers
Vietnamese film actresses
Vietnamese television actresses
People from Ho Chi Minh City